Leucine carboxyl methyltransferase 2 is an enzyme that in humans is encoded by the LCMT2 gene.

The protein encoded by this intronless gene belongs to the methyltransferase superfamily and acts as a G(1)/S and G(2)/M phase checkpoint regulator. It has been hypothesized that cigarette smoke-induced oxidative stress and transforming growth factor beta 1 may inhibit cellular proliferation by modulating the expression of this protein.

References

Further reading